Dieter Wiedemann (born 17 June 1941) is a German racing cyclist. He rode in the 1967 Tour de France.

References

External links
 

1941 births
Living people
German male cyclists
Place of birth missing (living people)
People from Flöha
Cyclists from Saxony
East German male cyclists
People from Bezirk Karl-Marx-Stadt
East German defectors
East German emigrants to West Germany